This is a list of compositions by French composer Jules Massenet (1842–1912).

Operas

Oratorios and cantatas
Louise de Mézières – 1862
David Rizzio – 1863
Marie-Magdeleine – 1873
Ève – 1875
Narcisse – 1877
La Vierge – 1880
Biblis – 1886
La Terre Promise – 1900

Ballets
Le carillon – 1892
Cigale – 1904
Espada – 1908
L'histoire de Manon (arr. Leighton Lucas) – 1974

Orchestral compositions
Orchestral Suite No. 1, Première suite d'orchestre – 1867
Orchestral Suite No. 2, Scènes hongroises – 1870
Orchestral Suite No. 3, Scènes dramatiques – 1875
Orchestral Suite No. 4, Scènes pittoresques – 1874
Orchestral Suite No. 5, Scènes napolitaines – 1876
Orchestral Suite No. 6, Scènes de féerie – 1881
Orchestral Suite No. 7, Scènes alsaciennes – 1882
Fantasy for cello and orchestra – 1897
Visions (poëme symphonique pour orchestre) – 1891
Valse très lente, for orchestra (1901)
Brumaire (ouverture pour le drame d'Édouard Noël) (1901)
Piano Concerto – 1902
 Ouverture de concert
 Overture to Racine's Phèdre
 Sarabande espagnole

Incidental music
 Les Érinnyes (containing the famous Élégie) – 1873
 Un drame sous Philippe II – 1875
 La vie de bohème – 1876
 L'Hetman – 1877
 Notre-Dame de Paris – 1879
 Michel Strogoff – 1880
 Nana-Sahin – 1883
 Théodora – 1884
 Le crocodile – 1900
 Phèdre – 1900
 Le grillon du foyer – 1904
 Le manteau du roi – 1907
 Perce-Neige et les sept gnomes – 1909
 Jérusalem – 1914

Song collections and cycles
Poème d'Avril (Armand Silvestre), Op. 14, songs, declaimed poems and piano solos, c.1866, published 1868
Poème pastoral (Florian and Armand Silvestre), baritone, 3 female voices, piano, 1870–72, published 1872
Chansons des bois d'Amaranthe (M. Legrand, after Redwitz), four solo voices (SATB) and piano, 1900, published 1901

Melodies (songs)

À Colombine (Sérénade d’Arlequin) (Louis Gallet)
À la trépassée (Armand Silvestre)
À la Zuecca (Alfred de Musset)
À Mignonne (Gustave Chouquet)
Adieu (Complainte) (Armand Silvestre)
Adieux (Gilbert)
Anniversaire (Armand Silvestre)
Aubade (Gabriel Prévost)
Automne (Paul Collin)
Berceuse (Gustave Chouquet)
Bonne nuit! (Camille Distel; translated into English by Helen Tretbar)
Ce que disent les cloches (Jean de la Vingtrie)
C'est l'amour (Victor Hugo)
Chant provençal (Michel Carré)
Comme autrefois (Jeanne Dortzal)
Crépuscule (Armand Silvestre)
Dans l'air plein de fils de soie (Armand Silvestre)
Déclaration (Gustave Chouquet)
Élégie (Louis Gallet)
Épitaphe (Armand Silvestre)
Être aimé (Jules Massenet after Victor Hugo)
Feux-follets d'amour (Madeleine Grain)
Guitare (Victor Hugo)
La Lettre (Catulle Mendès)
La mort de la cigale (Maurice Fauré)
La veillée du Petit Jésus (André Theuriet)
La vie d'une rose, Op. 12 n° 3 (Jules Ruelle)
L'air du soir emportait (Armand Silvestre)
L'âme des oiseau (Elena Vacarescu)
Le portrait d'une enfant, Op. 12 n° 4 (Pierre de Ronsard)
Le printemps visite la Terre (Jeanne Chaffotte)
Le sais-tu ? (Stéphan Bordèse)
Le sentier perdu (Paul de Choudens)
Le verger (Camille Distel)
Les Alcyons (Joseph Antoine Autran)
Les bois de pins (Camille Distel)
Les enfants
Les femmes de Magdala (Louis Gallet)
Les mains (Noel Bazan)
Les oiselets (Jacques Normand)
L'esclave, Op. 12 n° 1 (Théophile Gautier)
Lève-toi (Armand Silvestre)
Loin de moi ta lèvre qui ment (Jean Aicard)
Madrigal (Armand Silvestre)
Musette (Jean-Pierre Claris de Florian)
Narcisse à la fontaine (Paul Collin)
Néére (Michel Carré)
Nocturne (Jeanne Dortzal)
Nouvelle chanson sur un vieil air (Victor Hugo)
Nuit d'Espagne (Louis Gallet)
Ouvre tes yeux bleus (Paul Robiquet)
Pensée d'automne (Armand Silvestre)
Pour qu'à l'espérance (Armand Silvestre)
Prélude (Armand Silvestre)
Première danse (Jacques Clary Jean Normand)
Puisqu’elle a pris ma vie (Paul Robiquet)
Que l'heure est donc brève (Armand Silvestre)
Rêvons, c'est l'heure (Paul Verlaine)
Riez-vous (Armand Silvestre)
Rondel de la belle au bois (Julien Gruaz)
Rose de Mai (S.Poirson)
Roses d’Octobre (Paul Collin)
Sérénade (Molière)
Sérénade aux mariés, Op. 12 n° 2 (Jules Ruelle)
Sérénade de Zanetto (François Coppée)
Sérénade du passant (François Coppée)
Si tu veux, mignonne (Abbé Claude Georges Boyer)
Soir de rêve (Antonin Lugnier)
Soleil couchant (Victor Hugo)
Sonnet (Georges Pradel)
Sonnet matinal (Armand Silvestre)
Sonnet payen (Armand Silvestre)
Souhait (Jacques Normand)
Sous les branches (Armand Silvestre)
Souvenez-vous, Vierge Marie ! (Georges Boyer)
Souvenir de Venise (Alfred de Musset)
Stances (Gilbert)
Sur la source (Armand Silvestre)
Un adieu (Armand Silvestre)
Un souffle de parfums (Armand Silvestre)
Voici que les grans lys (Armand Silvestre)
Voix suprême (Antoinette Lafaix-Gontié)
Vous aimerez demain (Armand Silvestre)

Other
Morceau (Concours de flute 1881) flute and piano
Morceau (Concours de flute 1887) flute and piano
 Miscellaneous piano pieces
 Massenet completed and orchestrated Léo Delibes' unfinished opera Kassya
 Prelude in C major for organ
 "Duo" for double bass and cello

External links

 
Massenet, Jules